Yanis Nicolas Roumadi (born February 16, 1994) is an Algerian footballer who is now free agent.

References 

1994 births
Living people
Algerian footballers
Association football defenders
USM Alger players
21st-century Algerian people